Trevor Alan John Reader  is a retired Anglican priest: he was Archdeacon of Portsdown from 2006 until 2013.

Born in Pembrokeshire, Wales on 3 August 1946, he was educated at Portsmouth Polytechnic. He was a Research assistant then a Lecturer there until 1986; after which he studied for ordination at Salisbury and Wells Theological College.  He was an Assistant Curate at  St Mary, Alverstoke from  1986 to 1989 and then Priest in charge at St Mary, Hook-with-Warsash until 1998. He was Priest in charge of  Holy Trinity, Blendworth, with St Michael and all Angels, Chalton with St Hubert, Idsworth and  Diocesan Director of Non-Stipendiary Ministry until 2003 when he became Archdeacon of the Isle of Wight, a post he held until his appointment to Portsdown.

He retired in January 2013. He is married to Lynne and has 6 daughters.

Notes

1946 births
People associated with the University of Portsmouth
Archdeacons of the Isle of Wight
Archdeacons of Portsdown
Living people

English Anglican priests
21st-century English Anglican priests
People from Pembrokeshire
People educated at Salisbury Cathedral School